Abacetus rugatinus is a species of ground beetle in the subfamily Pterostichinae. It was described by Csiki in 1930.

References

rugatinus
Beetles described in 1930